The 1936 Hardin–Simmons Cowboys football team was an American football team that represented Hardin–Simmons University as an independent during the 1936 college football season. In its second season under head coach Frank Kimbrough, the team compiled a 9–2 record, defeated Texas Mines in the 1936 Sun Bowl, and outscored all opponents by a total of 302 to 41.

Schedule

References

Hardin-Simmons
Hardin–Simmons Cowboys football seasons
Sun Bowl champion seasons
Hardin-Simmons Cowboys football